Terrestrial analogue sites (also called "space analogues" or terrestrial analog sites) are places on Earth with assumed past or present geological, environmental or biological conditions of a celestial body such as the Moon or Mars. Analogue sites are used in the frame of space exploration to either study geological or biological processes observed on other planets, or to prepare astronauts for surface extra-vehicular activity.

Definition

Analogue sites are places on Earth with assumed, past or present, geological, environmental or biological conditions of a celestial body. Analogue site studies are necessary because they help to understand geological processes (on Earth) which can be extrapolated to other Solar System bodies in order to interpret and validate the data received from orbiters or planetary rovers. Analogue sites are also important for optimizing scientific and technological needs and exploration strategies in robotic or crewed missions to the Moon or Mars. The definition of space analogues is therefore rather vast, reaching from places on Earth that exhibit geologic or atmospheric characteristics which are close to those observed on other celestial bodies, to sites that are used for space mission simulations to test sampling or drilling equipment, space suits, or the performance of astronauts in reduced gravity.

Some sites are therefore suited to test instruments for exobiological research or to train sampling procedures for field explorations. Other sites offer an extreme environment that can be used by astronauts to prepare for the difficulties in future space missions.

Fidelity
An important notion in the evaluation of analogue sites is that of "fidelity", which describes the resemblance of the analogue to its extraterrestrial correspondent. Fidelity is used in comparative planetary science to express the analogy of a terrestrial site to a target extraterrestrial surface. This classification is possible based on various criteria such as geomorphology, geochemistry, exobiology or exploration conditions.

Geomorphology
Geomorphology is the scientific study of landforms and the processes that shape them. In terms of analogue sites, scientists search for locations on Earth that exhibit similar landforms such as can be found on exploration targets like the Moon, Mars or even asteroids and comets. The idea is to confront astronauts, robots or scientific equipment with sites that resemble in their geologic appearance those extraterrestrial surfaces. Examples are volcanic sites which resemble lunar terrain (regolith), polar locations and glaciers that can be compared to the poles of Mars or of Jupiter moon Europa, or terrestrial lava tubes which can also be found on the Moon or Mars.

Geochemistry
Geochemistry is the science that uses the principles of chemistry to explain the mechanisms behind major geological systems. The aspect of geochemistry is of importance for analogue sites when locations offer the possibility to test analysis instruments for future space missions (crewed or robotic). Geochemical fidelity is also of importance for the development and test of equipment used for in-situ resource utilization. Examples for such analogue sites are terrestrial volcanoes that offer rocks similar to those found on the Moon or hematite concretions which can be found in Earth deserts and also on Mars (so-called "Blueberries").

Exobiology
Exobiology or astrobiology is the study of the origin and evolution of extraterrestrial life. In terrestrial analogues efforts are put on the identification of so-called extremophile organisms, which are life forms that live and survive in extreme conditions such as can be found on other planets or moons. The objective of this research is to understand how such organisms survive and how they can be identified (or their remnants).

Examples of exobiology analogue sites are the Rio Tinto in Spain, which hosts bacteria that can survive high temperatures and harsh chemical conditions, or black smokers in the deep sea that host colonies of life forms in high-pressure and high-temperature conditions. The cold dry hyperarid core of the Atacama desert is one of the closest analogues for Martian surface conditions and is often used for testing rovers and life detection equipment that one day may be sent to Mars. Other extreme environments, such as the polar regions, high-altitude mountainous areas, or remote islands are also used in studies to better understanding of life under such conditions. Scientists can test at such analogue sites sampling equipment designed to search and identify lifeforms.

Exploration conditions
Another criterion to search for analogue sites are locations where the exploration conditions of future astronauts can be simulated. Future explorers of the Moon or Mars will have to handle various conditions, such as reduced gravity, radiation, work in pressurized space suits and extreme temperatures. Preparing astronauts for these conditions calls for training on sites that exhibit some of those conditions. The operations that can be simulated reach from living in isolation, to extra-vehicular activity (EVA) in reduced gravity to the construction of habitats. Examples for analogue sites that offer such exploration conditions are research stations at the poles or underwater EVA training as it is done at NEEMO by NASA, at the Marseilles subsea analogue by COMEX, or by using parabolic flights to simulate lower gravity for shorter durations. Underwater analogue sites allow for the training of astronauts in neutral buoyancy conditions (such as is done in test pools at NASA, ESA or Star City in Russia) while operating on a natural terrain. Potential targets for such training are missions to the Moon and Mars, to test sampling, drilling and field explorations in 1/6th or 1/3rd of Earth's gravity, or asteroids, and to test anchoring systems in microgravity.

History of the space analogues
The notion of space analogues is not new. NASA has used such sites for a long time to train its astronauts for space missions. The following data are taken from the official website of NASA.

The first analog mission was undertaken in 1997 in Arizona. Since then, NASA leads annual missions there to evaluate and test EVAs and outpost systems and operations. This site was chosen to test the materials in a desolate environment with rugged terrain, dust storms, extreme temperatures...

In the same year, the Haughton-Mars Project (HMP) was started on Devon Island in the Arctic. Since then, 14 missions have been conducted there to test technology and operations in a remote, extreme environment and conduct science research on the Mars-like terrain.

In 2001, NASA conducted the mission named NEEMO near Florida,  underwater, that was supposed to be a simulation for six aquanauts living in a confined space. It was also the way to test the exploration equipment in an extreme and isolated environment. Since 2001, 14 missions have been undertaken there in a multi-organizational environment.

Since 2004, two-week missions are conducted every summer in Pavilion Lake in Canada. This analogue site allows astronauts to train in searching for evidence of life in an extreme environment with reduced-gravity conditions. This is an international and multi-organizational project conducted underwater.

The last analogue site used by NASA is at Mauna Kea on the Big Island of Hawaii, after which an analogue base under the name of HI-SEAS was founded on Mauna Loa. In total, six NASA missions have started in this base between 2013 and 2018, until the sixth HI-SEAS mission was halted due to a medical emergency. This project was led to test technologies for sustaining human exploration on desolate planetary surfaces like the Moon or Mars and explore social wellbeing and crew dynamics on long-duration missions. HI-SEAS is currently under management of the International Moonbase Alliance, founded by Henk Rogers.

Keen interest for space analogues has emerged through the student community, the 2017 NASA Ames Grand Prize Winning entry Anastasi, explores the possibility of an underwater settlement as a preliminary to space settlement infrastructure.

Objectives
The history of the use of terrestrial analogues shows the importance attached to using analogue sites in validating spatial technologies and scientific instruments. But analogue sites also have other uses:

Training
Space analogues can help to train personnel in using technologies and instruments, and in knowing how to behave with a spacesuit. Thus two types of analogue sites exist: underwater sites and surface sites.

 Underwater sites simulate a reduced-gravity environment by compensating weight by the Archimedes' principle, thus simulating zero gravity or reduced gravity (lunar gravity, for example).
 Surface sites serve to train astronauts to walk and move within a spacesuit, and to test the Mars Exploration Rover (for example). Expeditions to surface sites also help teach geology to astronauts, who mostly trained as pilots.

Exobiology

Space analogues may have potential similarities to environments for exobiology. In some places on Earth the conditions allow only certain types of organisms - extremophile organisms - to live.

Currently used space analogues
Following table lists currently used space analogues on Earth.

See also
Martian regolith simulant
Lunar regolith simulant
Present day Mars habitability analogue environments on Earth
Planetary Science
Planetary Habitability

References 

Astrobiology
Planetary geology
Spaceflight